Amblytelus handkei is a species of ground beetle in the subfamily Psydrinae. It was described by Baehr in 2004.

References 

Amblytelus
Beetles described in 2004